Peter van Stipdonk (born in Eindhoven) is a former Dutch slalom canoeist who competed from the late 1960s to the late 1970s. He won a bronze medal in the mixed C-2 event at the 1973 ICF Canoe Slalom World Championships in Muotathal.

References

Year of birth missing (living people)
Living people
Dutch male canoeists
Sportspeople from Eindhoven
Medalists at the ICF Canoe Slalom World Championships
20th-century Dutch people